The 2018 Football Queensland season was the sixth season since NPL Queensland commenced as the top tier of Queensland men's football. This season was also the initial season of the Football Queensland Premier League which occupied the second tier in Queensland men's football in 2018. 

Below NPL Queensland and the FQPL was a regional structure of ten zones with their own leagues. The strongest of the zones was Football Brisbane with its senior men's competition consisting of four divisions.

The NPL Queensland premiers qualified for the National Premier Leagues finals series, competing with the other state federation champions in a final knockout tournament to decide the National Premier Leagues Champion for 2018.

Men's League Tables

2018 National Premier League Queensland

The National Premier League Queensland 2018 season was played over 26 matches, followed by a finals series.

Finals

2018 Football Queensland Premier League

The 2018 Football Queensland Premier League was the first edition of the Football Queensland Premier League and is the second level domestic association football competition in Queensland.

Finals

2018 Brisbane Premier League

The 2018 Brisbane Premier League was the 36th edition of the Brisbane Premier League which became a third level domestic association football competition in Queensland with the formation of the Football Queensland Premier League in 2018.

Finals

2018 Capital League 1

The 2018 Capital League 1 season was the sixth edition of Capital League 1 which became a fourth level domestic association football competition in Queensland with the formation of the Football Queensland Premier League in 2018.12 teams competed, all playing each other twice for a total of 22 matches.

Finals

2018 Capital League 2

The 2018 Capital League 2 season was the sixth edition of Capital League 2 which became a fifth level domestic association football competition in Queensland with the formation of the Football Queensland Premier League in 2018. Following the withdrawal of Redcliffe PCYC prior to the start of the season, the league comprised 11 teams which played each other twice for a total of 20 matches.

Finals

2018 Capital League 3

The 2018 Capital League 3 season was the sixth edition of Capital League 3 which became a sixth level domestic association football competition in Queensland with the formation of the Football Queensland Premier League in 2018. 11 teams competed, all playing each other twice for a total of 20 matches.

Finals

Women's League Tables

2018 Women's NPL Queensland

The 2018 Women's NPL Queensland season was the fourth edition of the Women's NPL Queensland as the top level domestic football of women's competition in Queensland. 14 teams competed, all playing each other twice for a total of 26 matches.

Finals

Cup Competitions

2018 Canale Cup

Brisbane-based soccer clubs competed in 2018 for the Canale Cup, known for sponsorship reasons as the 2018 Pig 'N' Whistle Canale Cup. Clubs entered from the Brisbane Premier League, the Capital League 1, Capital League 2 and Capital League 3. The early rounds of the competition were linked to the qualifying competition for the 2018 FFA Cup, where losing teams from successive rounds of the FFA Cup Preliminary rounds entered in following rounds of the Canale Cup.

This knockout competition was won by Grange Thistle.

FFA Cup Qualifiers

Queensland-based soccer clubs competed in 2018 in the Preliminary rounds for the 2018 FFA Cup. The four winners of Seventh Round qualified for the final rounds of the FFA Cup; Cairns FC (representing North Queensland), Gold Coast Knights (representing South Queensland), with Olympic FC and Queensland Lions representing Brisbane. In addition, A-League club Brisbane Roar qualified for the final rounds, entering at the Round of 32.

References

2018 in Australian soccer
Football Queensland seasons